Gymnocalycium nova is a globular cactus.  Plants have a round appearance and spines that are curved back towards the body.   The cactus grows in South America, enjoys full sunlight, and is very drought resistant.  The species includes the cultivar 'Sierra Medina'.

References

nova
Cacti of South America
Flora of Argentina